Đurađ Crnojević (d. 1514) was the last Serbian medieval Lord of Zeta between 1490 and 1496, from the Crnojevic dynasty. The son of Ivan Crnojević and Goisava Arianiti, he was the founder of the first South Slavic printing house. Crnojević styled himself "Duke of Zeta". He was well known by his great education, knowledge of astronomy, geometry and other sciences.

During his short-term reign he became famous for making efforts to spread the cultural heritage rather than for his political successes. The Ottomans made him leave Zeta in 1496. His brother Stefan inherited his position of the Lord of Zeta. In 1497 Venetians imprisoned Đurađ for some time, accusing him to be an Ottoman collaborator. He again spent some time in Venetian prison in period between 30 July and 25 October 1498. This time the Ottomans insisted that Venetians should put him into prison, which they eventually did. On 22 October 1499 he wrote his testament, which is considered as valuable literature work of its time.

In the spring of 1500 Đurađ Crnojević came to Scutari, based on the invitation of Feriz Beg who instructed Crnojević to travel to Istanbul. In Istanbul Crnojević officially ceded his possessions to the sultan who granted him an estate (timar) in Anatolia  to govern it as its sipahi.

Although he was removed from the historical scene, his books remained as a great contribution to the Serbian culture. With the help of Hieromonk Makarije he printed five books of importance to the Montenegrin cultural heritage: Oktoih prvoglasnik (1493/94), Oktoih petoglasnik (1494), Psaltir s posljedovanjem (1495), Trebnik (prayer book; 1495/96), and Četvorojevanđelje (probably 1496).

Ancestry

His grandmother from his father's side was a sister of Skanderbeg. This made Đurađ Skanderbeg's grandnephew and through his mother he was the grandson of Gjergj Arianiti and nephew of Scanderbeg's wife Donika Kastrioti .

References

Sources 
 
 
 
 
 
 

15th-century births
1514 deaths
15th-century rulers in Europe
15th-century Serbian nobility
15th-century Venetian people
Durad 4
Printers of incunabula
Ottoman vassalage